Banco Continental may refer to:
BBVA Continental, a Peruvian bank 
Banco Continental, a Honduran bank